Galerie Huit was an art collective and gallery established by American artists in Paris in 1950. During the mid-twentieth century American artists traveled and lived in Paris to study and make art. Many of the male American artists were able to finance excursions to France because of the Servicemen's Readjustment Act of 1944 (the G.I. Bill). The city provided access to modern art as well as African art. Led by Haywood Rivers, American artists in Paris at that time united to create a cooperative gallery space to show their work. 

The Galerie Huit was located at 8, rue St. Julien le Pauvre. It existed from 1950 through 1954 according to a catalogue for the Reina Sofia Museum, other sources state that exhibitions were held from 1950 through 1952. 

Artists associated with the gallery include:

In 2002 the Studio 18 Gallery in New York City held an exhibition entitled Galerie Huit: American Artists in Paris 1950-1952 featuring Galerie Huit artists. In 2018 the Reina Sofia Museum in Madrid, Spain held an exhibition entitled Lost, Loose and Loved: Foreign Artists in Paris 1944-1968 that featured several of the Galerie Huit artists.

References

Art museums and galleries in Paris
Art galleries established in 1950
Defunct art museums and galleries in Paris